The women's marathon at the 1983 Summer Universiade was held in Edmonton, Canada on 9 July 1983. It was the first time that the event was contested by women at the Universiade.

Results

References

Athletics at the 1983 Summer Universiade
1983